Mikhail Ivanovich Maryushkin (born 14 June 1968) is a former Russian professional footballer.

Club career
He played in the Russian Premier League for FC Lokomotiv Moscow in 1993.

Honours
 Russian Second Division Zone 3 top scorer: 1992 (26 goals).

External links
 

1968 births
Footballers from Moscow
Living people
Soviet footballers
Russian footballers
Russian Premier League players
Russian expatriate footballers
Expatriate footballers in Bulgaria
FC Lokomotiv Moscow players
OFC Pirin Blagoevgrad players
FC Saturn Ramenskoye players
Russian expatriate sportspeople in Bulgaria
First Professional Football League (Bulgaria) players
FC Dynamo Moscow reserves players
Association football forwards
Association football midfielders
FC Spartak Ryazan players